Wireless network cards for computers require control software to make them function (firmware, device drivers). This is a list of the status of some open-source drivers for 802.11 wireless network cards.

Linux

Status

Driver capabilities

DragonFly BSD

FreeBSD

Status

Driver capabilities

NetBSD

OpenBSD
The following is an incomplete list of supported wireless devices:

Status

Driver capabilities

Solaris and OpenSolaris

Darwin, OpenDarwin and macOS

Notes

References

http://support.intel.com/support/notebook/sb/CS-006408.htm
The SourceForge IPW websites (ipw 2100,ipw2200 and ipw3945)
The FSF website for the Ralink and Realtek cards
Kerneltrap for the list of OpenBSD drivers
The OpenSolaris website for the list of OpenSolaris and Solaris drivers
https://web.archive.org/web/20070927014705/http://rt2x00.serialmonkey.com/phpBB2/viewtopic.php?t=2084
https://web.archive.org/web/20060908050351/http://rt2x00.serialmonkey.com/wiki/index.php/Rt2x00_beta
http://www.hpl.hp.com/personal/Jean_Tourrilhes/Linux/Wireless.html 
rt2x00 README from cvs
https://lkml.org/lkml/2007/2/9/323

External links 
Seattle Wireless Linux drivers
Seattle Wireless Mac OS drivers
wireless.kernel.org Wiki
Current Stable Linux kernel: Wireless
Open Documentation for Hardware, a 2006 presentation by Theo de Raadt

Free software lists and comparisons
Wireless networking
Wireless drivers
Linux drivers